
Ivanovka may refer to:

Russia
Ivanovka, Russia, name of several rural localities in Russia
Ivanovka estate near Tambov, Russia
Ivanovka (river), a river in Saint Petersburg, Russia

Ukraine
Ivanivka, Khmelnytskyi Oblast, a village in Khmelnytskyi Raion of Khmelnytskyi Oblast, Ukraine
Ivanivka, Kherson Oblast, an urban-type settlement in Kherson Oblast, Ukraine
Ivanivka, Odessa Oblast, an urban-type settlement in Odessa Oblast, Ukraine

Other
İvanovka, a village and municipality in Ismayilli District of Azerbaijan
Ivanovka, Kyrgyzstan, a village in Ysyk-Ata District, Kyrgyzstan

See also
Ivanivka Raion (disambiguation)